Asahel Warner House is a historic home located at Lima in Livingston County, New York. It was built about 1810 and is a large two story, three bay, rectangular frame dwelling with its gable end oriented toward the street. A one-story kitchen wing is located at the rear. It was remodeled in the 1860s / 1870s and in 1907 and features Italianate details.  A third floor attic contains a Masonic Lodge meeting room with paneling dated to 1907.  It is set into the eaves of the front two thirds of the building and lit only by the front oculus window.  Also on the property are a contributing barn, shed, and chicken coop.

It was listed on the National Register of Historic Places in 1989.

References

Houses on the National Register of Historic Places in New York (state)
Houses completed in 1810
Masonic buildings in New York (state)
Houses in Livingston County, New York
National Register of Historic Places in Livingston County, New York